Munira Wilson ( Hassam; born 26 April 1978) is a British Liberal Democrat politician who was elected as the Member of Parliament (MP) for Twickenham at the 2019 general election. She succeeded the former Liberal Democrat leader Sir Vince Cable as MP. She has served as the Liberal Democrat Spokesperson for Education since 2021 under Sir Ed Davey, and previously as the Liberal Democrat Spokesperson for Health, Wellbeing and Social Care from 2020 to 2021.

Early life
Munira Hassam was born in 1978 to parents of East African Indian heritage. Her parents were both born in Zanzibar. Her father went to study in Britain. Her mother, aged 21 and stateless, fled to Britain during the Zanzibar Revolution. They met in Britain.

She grew up in London and attended Henrietta Barnett School, a state grammar school in north London. She then went on to study at St Catharine's College, Cambridge from 1996 to 2000, where she graduated with a degree in Modern Languages (French and German), including a year abroad as an English assistant in two secondary schools in southern France.

After graduation, she trained as a tax consultant with Ernst & Young. She then switched to working for the Liberal Democrats, becoming the campaigns organiser for Sue Doughty and the Guildford Liberal Democrats in 2004–5, ahead of Doughty losing her Guildford seat at the 2005 general election. She went on to work for newly elected MP Nick Clegg for the first six months of 2006. She subsequently went on to spend over a decade as a lobbyist, until her election to Parliament in 2019, firstly for Save the Children (2006–08), then for Beating Bowel Cancer (2008–09), and Novartis (2009–15), where she rose to become head of government affairs – pharmaceuticals. She then entered the public sector as a strategic account manager at NHS Digital from 2015 to 2016, before returning to lobbying in 2016-9 as corporate affairs director, UK & Ireland for the German science and technology company Merck KGaA Darmstadt.

Political career
Wilson served a term as a councillor on Richmond upon Thames London Borough Council from 2006 to 2010. She contested Twickenham's neighbouring constituency of Feltham and Heston in the 2010 general election, where she came third. In the 2012 London Assembly election she stood in South West constituency.

She was selected in 2019 to replace Sir Vince Cable as the Liberal Democrat candidate in his Twickenham constituency, and went on to hold the seat with an increased majority at the 2019 United Kingdom general election. She won the seat with 36,166 votes (56.1% of the total votes cast), giving her a majority of 14,121 over her Conservative opponent. The Green Party in Twickenham had voted to stand aside to support Wilson.

Wilson has opposed plans for a third runway at Heathrow Airport, and has worked to improve rail services in South West London. Twickenham is on a flight path to Heathrow, and Wilson has stated that "We are absolutely 100% opposed to Heathrow expansion." However, she supports the construction of HS2 high speed rail, saying that "HS2 is a vital project for reducing our carbon emissions and unlocking the economic potential of the North, but Ministers should not be given a blank cheque.".  She was appointed Liberal Democrat spokesperson for Health, Wellbeing and Social Care by acting leader Ed Davey in January 2020.

In May 2021, alongside celebrities and other public figures, Wilson was a signatory to an open letter from Stylist magazine which called on the government to address what it described as an "epidemic of male violence" by funding an "ongoing, high-profile, expert-informed awareness campaign on men’s violence against women and girls".

In June 2022 she was accused by the RMT union of supporting 'strike-breaking' after she called for the army to be brought in to keep trains running during a televised BBC debate. The Senior assistant general secretary of the RMT, Eddie Dempsey, accused her of "going to war on workers.”

Personal life
Munira Hassam married Michael Wilson at St Stephen's, Twickenham, in 2007. She was raised a Muslim and now identifies as a committed Christian.

References

External links

 Official website
Appearances on C-SPAN
 Profile at the Liberal Democrats
 
 Twitter

Living people
Alumni of St Catharine's College, Cambridge
UK MPs 2019–present
21st-century British women politicians
British former Muslims
Converts to Christianity from Islam
Councillors in the London Borough of Richmond upon Thames
English Christians
Liberal Democrats (UK) councillors
Liberal Democrats (UK) MPs for English constituencies
Female members of the Parliament of the United Kingdom for English constituencies
1978 births
British politicians of Indian descent
21st-century English women
21st-century English people
Women councillors in England